Jeremy Molod is an American sound editor. He was nominated for an Academy Award in the category Best Sound for the film Mank.

Selected filmography 
 Mank (2020; co-nominated with Ren Klyce, David Parker, Nathan Nance and Drew Kunin)

References

External links 

Living people
Place of birth missing (living people)
Year of birth missing (living people)
American sound editors